One Day at a Time is an American sitcom loosely based on the 1975–1984 CBS series of the same name, developed as a Netflix original program and later airing on Pop TV. The series is written by Gloria Calderón Kellett and Mike Royce. Justina Machado, Todd Grinnell, Isabella Gómez, Marcel Ruiz, Stephen Tobolowsky, and Rita Moreno star in the series, with Pam Fryman directing the pilot episode. The first season, consisting of thirteen episodes, was released on January 6, 2017.

On March 4, 2017, the series was renewed by Netflix for a second season, which premiered on January 26, 2018. On March 26, 2018, a third season was ordered, which was released on February 8, 2019. On June 27, 2019, Pop TV commissioned a fourth season of the series, after Netflix canceled it in March 2019. The fourth season premiered on March 24, 2020, and was simulcast on Logo TV and TV Land. TV Land continued to simulcast the Pop TV-originated episodes throughout the fourth season.

 On March 20, 2020 it was announced that production was suspended due to the COVID-19 pandemic, with the series continuing to air new episodes through April 28. The next day, plans were announced to make an animated special, further reported on May 14 as "The Politics Episode”. The episode premiered on June 16, 2020. In October 2020, reruns of all season 4 episodes, excluding the show's animated special "The Politics Episode," would air on CBS. On November 24, 2020, Pop canceled the series after the fourth season, but Sony Pictures TV will be shopping the series for other outlets. On December 8, 2020 it was announced that there would be no new episodes, officially cancelling the show for a third, and final, time.

Series overview

Episodes

Season 1 (2017)

Season 2 (2018)

Season 3 (2019)

Season 4 (2020) 
</onlyinclude>

Ratings

Season 4

References

One Day